Jana may refer to:

Entertainment
 Jana (film), a 2004 Tamil film by Shaji Kailas
 Jana (singer) (born 1974), Serbian singer
 Jana (Native American singer), née Jana Mashonee
 Jana of the Jungle, animated series created by Doug Wildey for Hanna-Barbera Productions
 Jana, a character in the television series Containment
 "Jana", a single by Killing Joke from the album Pandemonium

Other
 Jana (given name), a given name (and list of people with the given name)
 Jana (brand), a brand of drinks
 Jana (moth), a genus of moths
 Jana (Vedic period), a term for tribes in ancient India
 Jana Bhava (knowledge), a sutra and Putanjali's discourse related to the basic tenets of Yoga and is wisdom  
 Jamahiriya News Agency or JANA, Libya's state news agency (1964–2011)
 Diana (mythology), also called Jana, the ancient Roman goddess of the moon, the hunt, and chastity

See also

Janna (disambiguation)
Janata (disambiguation)
Lok (disambiguation), people in Hindi
Awam (disambiguation), people in Urdu
Awami (disambiguation)